Marko Tolić (born 5 July 1996) is a Croatian professional footballer who plays as an attacking midfielder for Maribor, on loan from Dinamo Zagreb.

Honours
Dinamo Zagreb
Prva HNL: 2020–21, 2021–22
Croatian Cup: 2020–21

References

External links
 

1996 births
Living people
Footballers from Zagreb
Association football midfielders
Croatian footballers
NK Lokomotiva Zagreb players
NK Sesvete players
NK Hrvatski Dragovoljac players
NK Lučko players
HNK Gorica players
GNK Dinamo Zagreb players
GNK Dinamo Zagreb II players
NK Maribor players
First Football League (Croatia) players
Croatian Football League players
Slovenian PrvaLiga players
Croatian expatriate footballers
Expatriate footballers in Slovenia
Croatian expatriate sportspeople in Slovenia